Sahitya Akademi Translation Prizes are given each year to writers for their outstanding translations work in the 24 official languages of India, since 1989.

Recipients 
Following is the list of recipients of Sahitya Akademi translation prizes for their works written in Sindhi. The award, as of 2019, consisted of 50,000.

See also 
 List of Sahitya Akademi Award winners for Sindhi

References

External links 
 Akademi Translation Prizes For Sindhi language

Sahitya Akademi Prize for Translation
Indian literary awards